Thomas Lynch Moore (born 25 July 1936) is an English former amateur footballer who played as a goalkeeper in the Football League for Darlington.

Moore was born in Trimdon, County Durham. He played football for his local club, Trimdon Grange of the Wearside League, before joining Darlington during the 1956–57 season. He played regularly for the reserves in the North-Eastern League, but appeared only once for the first team, standing in for Ron Ward for the Fourth Division match at home to York City on 13 April 1957. Darlington lost 4–2, and another debutant, John Tennant, came in for the next match. He later returned to the Wearside League with Wingate Welfare.

References

1936 births
Living people
People from Trimdon
Footballers from County Durham
English footballers
Association football goalkeepers
Trimdon Grange F.C. players
Darlington F.C. players
Wingate F.C. (Durham) players
English Football League players